The Volkswagen Passat is a series of large family cars built since 1973 named after the German word for "trade wind".

Passat may also refer to:

People
 Raymond Passat (born 1913), a former French professional road bicycle racer

Other uses
 Passat (ship), a German sailing ship
 Passat, the German word for trade wind (a type of wind)
 Passat Nunatak, a glacial island